Rajampet Assembly constituency is a constituency of Andhra Pradesh Legislative Assembly, India, being one among 6 constituencies in Annamaya district. It is part of Rajampet Lok Sabha constituency along with other six Vidhan Sabha segments, namely, Kodur, Rayachoti, in Kadapa district and Thamballapalle Pileru, Madanapalle, Punganur in Chittoor district.

Meda Venkata Mallikarjuna Reddy of YSR Congress Party is currently representing the constituency.

Mandals

Members of Legislative Assembly

Election results

Assembly elections 1952

Assembly Elections 2004

Assembly Elections 2009

Assembly elections 2014

Assembly Elections 2019

See also
 List of constituencies of Andhra Pradesh Vidhan Sabha

References

Assembly constituencies of Andhra Pradesh